The 2007-08 Libyan Trophy was the first edition of the competition, organised by the Libyan Football Federation. The first round of matches took place on May 23, 2008, with the final taking place on June 18. The sixteen sides that competed in the 2007-08 Libyan Premier League entered the competition, with the exception of Al Ahly Tripoli and Al Jazeera. The fourteen remaining sides were sorted into four groups, half with three teams, the other half with four teams. Groups A and B contained teams from Western Libya, and Groups C and D contained teams from Eastern Libya. Each team played each other once, with the top team from each group going through to form the semi-finals.

Awards 
 Winners - LYD 100,000
 Runners-Up - LYD 50,000
 3rd Place - LYD 25,000

Groups

Group A 
 Al Tersanah
 Al Madina
 Al Olomby
 Al Shat

Group B 
 Al Ittihad
 Al Wahda
 Al Urouba

Group C 
 Khaleej Sirte
 Al Ahly Benghazi
 Nojom Ajdabiya
 Al Tahaddy

Group D 
 Al Akhdar
 Al Suqoor
 Al Nasr

References 

Trophy